Walton Street Capital is a private equity real estate investment firm founded in 1994 and headquartered in Chicago, with a satellite office in Mexico City. Through its affiliates, Walton Street Capital has raised over $14 billion of equity and loan commitments from a broad cross-section of sophisticated institutional investors including public and corporate pension plans, foreign institutions, insurance companies and banks, FoF managers, endowments and foundations, trusts, family offices, and high net worth individuals.  The firm, through its affiliates, has invested in more than 500 separate transactions in U.S. and international real estate, including the development and acquisition of industrial, logistics, multifamily, single-family rental, mixed-use, hotel, office, retail, and other assets through both individual, portfolio and company-level transactions. Walton Street’s senior management has collectively acquired, financed, managed and sold over $50 billion of investments in real estate and real estate operating companies.

References 

1994 establishments in Illinois
Companies based in Chicago